The Superbet Arena (known as Rapid Stadium prior to sponsorship) is a football-specific stadium located in the Giulești neighbourhood of Bucharest, Romania. It has been home to Liga I club Rapid București since its opening in March 2022, and has a capacity of 14,047 people. 

The €67 million stadium replaced the original Valentin Stănescu Stadium. It hosted the 2022 Cupa României Final.

From November 2022, the naming rights were sold to Superbet for the next five years.

Events

Association football

Gallery

See also 
Arena Națională
Stadionul Steaua
Stadionul Arcul de Triumf
List of football stadiums in Romania
List of European stadia by capacity

References
   

 
FC Rapid București
Football venues in Romania  
Buildings and structures in Bucharest 
Sports venues in Bucharest 
2022 establishments in Romania  
Sports venues completed in 2022 
Romania national football team